Mark Andrew Everett (born 11 November 1967) is a former English cricketer.  Everett was a left-handed batsman who bowled slow left-arm orthodox.  He was born in Harlow, Essex.

Everett made his debut for Hertfordshire in the 1992 MCCA Knockout Trophy against Oxfordshire.  Everett played Minor counties cricket for Hertfordshire from 1992 to 2002, which included 39 Minor Counties Championship matches and 13 MCCA Knockout Trophy matches.  He made his List A debut against the Sussex Cricket Board in the 1999 NatWest Trophy.  He made 3 further List A appearances for the county, the last coming against Bedfordshire in the 1st round of the 2003 Cheltenham & Gloucester Trophy which was held in 2002.  In his 4 List A matches, he scored 26 runs at an average of 6.50, with a high score of 14.

References

External links

1967 births
Living people
Sportspeople from Harlow
English cricketers
Hertfordshire cricketers